Sri Kanchi Kamakoti Peetham, also called the Sri Kanchi Matham or the Sri Kanchi Monastery or the Sarvagna Peetha, is a Hindu institution, located in Kanchipuram, Tamil Nadu. It is located near a temple dedicated to Goddess Sri Kamakshi (Durga, Kamakoti, Maha Tripurasundari) of the Shaktism tradition, along with a shrine for the Advaita Vedanta teacher Adi Shankara.  

The matha-tradition attributes its founding to Adi Shankara, but this and the reliability of the matha's succession list has been questioned. The Kanchi Math was originally established as the Kumbakonam Mutt in 1821 as a branch of the Sringeri Mutt, and later became involved with the Kamakshi temple in Kanchipuram. According to the Sri Kanchi math tradition, the matha was founded at Kanchipuram, and shifted south to the temple city of Kumbakonam in mid-18th-century due to the on-going wars, when there was warfare in the region, and returned to Kanchipuram in the 19th century.   

The matha is a living tradition, that continues to pursue spiritual scholarship in contemporary times. Since February 2018, the institution has been led by Vijayendra Saraswathi Shankaracharya Swamigal.

History 

The founding of Kanchi Kamakoti Peetam is traditionally attributed by its adherents to Adi Shankara, but this and the reliability of the matha's succession list has been questioned. Sringeri matha rejects the claims of Kanchi Kamakoti Peetam, and does not count it among the mathas established by Shankara. According to Clark, the story of the four cardinal mathas founded by Shankara dates from the 16th century, questioning the founding stories off all those mathas.

According to the Kanchi matha's tradition and various eminent scholars, their monastery was founded in Kali 2593 (509 BCE) by Adi Shankara. According to the Sri Kanchi matha documents, the matha relocated completely to Kumbakonam in mid-18th century to escape wars and persecution. According to Jonathan Bader and other scholars, the monastic tradition gives "fear of Muslim atrocities" from Nawab of Arcot, Mysore's Hyder Ali and Tipu Sultan as the reason, but the details remain unclear. According to T. A. Gopinatha Rao, copperplate inscriptions show that the matha was located at Kanchipuram until 1686 CE, and relocated to Kumbhakonam, Tajore, in the 18th century. According to Rao, based on the oldest record found in the respective mathas (1291 and 1346 respectively), Kanchipuram matha may be older than Sringeri Pitham. The matha returned to Kanchi in the 19th century.

The successive heads of the Kanchi and all other major Hindu Advaita tradition monasteries have been called Shankaracharya leading to confusion, discrepancies and scholarly disputes. The chronology stated in Kanchi matha texts recognizes five major Shankaras: Adi, Kripa, Ujjvala, Muka and Abhinava. According to the Kanchi matha tradition, it is "Abhinava Shankara" that western scholarship recognizes as the Advaita scholar Adi Shankara. Scholars such as William Cenkner, Christopher Fuller and David Smith dispute this traditional belief, though they accept that the Kanchi Shankaracharyas are his direct "spiritual descendants".

The 70th Shankaracharya, Sri Sankara Vijayendra Saraswati is the current Shankaracharya, before which, the matha was headed by Sri Jayendra Saraswathi, the 69th Shankaracharya. 

The Kanchi monastery, along with its sister monasteries across India, has also been an important preserver and source of historic palm leaf manuscripts.

Sankararaman murder case

In 2004, Jagadguru Sri Jayendra Saraswathi Mahaswamigal and his junior Vijayendra Saraswati were arrested in connection with the Sankararaman murder case on Diwali day. The court said that the complainant failed to support the prosecution and he was given bail. The trial went on till 2013 when he was acquitted by the court.

Chronological list of Shankaracharyas

According to the Peetham, the chronological list of Guru Paramapara of the matham is follows:

  Sri Adi Sankara Bhagavatpada (482 BCE–477 BCE)
  Sri Suresvaracharya (477 BCE–407 BCE)
  Sri Sarvajnatmanendra Saraswati (407 BCE–367 BCE)
  Sri Sathyabodhendra Saraswati (367 BCE–268 BCE)
 Sri Jnanandendra Saraswati (268 BCE–205 BCE)
 Sri Suddhanandendra Saraswati (205 BCE–124 BCE)
 Sri Aanandaghanendra Saraswati (124 BCE–55 BCE)
 Sri Kaivalyanandayogendra Saraswati (55 BCE–28 CE)
 Sri Krpa Sankarendra Saraswati (28 CE–69 CE)
 Sri Sureswara Saraswati (69 CE–127 CE)
 Sri Sivananda Chidghanendra Saraswati (127 CE–172 CE)
 Sri Chandrasekharendra Saraswati (172–235)
 Sri Satchidghanendra Saraswati (235–272)
 Sri Vidyaghanendra Saraswati (272–317)
 Sri Gangadharendra Saraswati (317–329)
 Sri Ujjvala Sankarendra Saraswati (329–367)
 Sri Sadasivendra Saraswati (367–375)
 Sri Shankarananda Saraswati (375–385)
 Sri Martanda Vidyaghanendra Saraswati (385–398)
 Sri Muka Sankarendra Saraswati (398–437)
 Sri Chandrasekharendra Saraswati II (437–447)
 Sri Bodhendra Saraswati (447–481)
 Sri Satchisukhendra Saraswati (481–512)
 Sri Chitsukhendra Saraswati (512–527)
 Sri Satchidanandaghanendra Saraswati (527–548)
 Sri Prajnaghanendra Saraswati (548–565)
 Sri Chidvilasendra Saraswati (565–577)
 Sri Mahadevendra Saraswati I (577–601)
 Sri Purnabhodhendra Saraswati (601–618)
 Sri Bhodhendra Saraswati II (618–655)
 Sri Brahmanandaghanendra Saraswati (655–668)
 Sri Chidanandaghanendra Saraswati (668–672)
 Sri Satchidananda Saraswati (672–692)
 Sri Chandrasekharendra Saraswati III (692–710)
 Sri Chitsukhendra Saraswati (710–737)
 Sri Chitsukhanandendra Saraswati (737–758)
 Sri Vidyaghanendra Saraswati III (758–788)
 Sri Abhinava Sankarendra Saraswati (788–840)
 Sri Satchidvilaasendra Saraswati (840–873)
 Sri Mahadevendra Saraswati II (873–915)
 Sri Gangadharendra Saraswati II (915–950)
 Sri Brahmanandaghanendra Saraswati (950–978)
 Sri Anandaghanendra Saraswati (978–1014)
 Sri Purnabhodhendra Saraswati II (1014–1040)
 Sri Paramasivendra Saraswati I (1040–1061)
 Sri Sandranandabhodhendra Saraswati (1061–1098)
 Sri Chandrasekharendra Saraswati IV (1098–1166)
 Sri Advaitanandabodhendra Saraswati (1166–1200)
 Sri Mahadevendra Saraswati III (1200–1247)
 Sri Chandrachudendra Saraswati I (1247–1297)
 Sri Vidyateerthendra Saraswati (1297–1385)
 Sri Sankaranandendra Saraswati (1385–1417)
 Sri Purnananda Sadasivendra Saraswati (1417–1498)
 Sri Vyasachala Mahadevendra Saraswati (1498–1507)
 Sri Chandrachudhendra Saraswati II (1507–1524)
 Sri Sarvajna Sadasiva Bhodhendra Saraswati (1524–1539)
 Sri Paramasivendra Saraswati II (1539–1586)
 Sri Atma Bodhendra Saraswati (1586–1638)
 Sri Bodhendra Saraswathi (1638–1692)
 Sri Advaitatma Prakasendra Saraswati (1692–1704)
 Sri Mahadevendra Saraswati IV (1704–1746)
 Sri ChandrasekharendraSaraswati V (1746–1783)
 Sri Mahadevendra Saraswati V (1783–1813)
 Sri Chandrasekharendra Saraswati VI (1813–1851)
 Sri Sudarsana Mahadevendra Saraswati (1851–1891)
 Sri Chandrasekharendra Saraswati VII  (1891 – 7 February 1907)
 Sri Mahadevendra Saraswathi V (7 February 1907 – 13 February 1907)
 Sri Chandrashekarendra Saraswati (13 February 1907 – 8 January 1994)
 Sri Jayendra Saraswathi (3 January 1994 – 28 February 2018)
 Sri Shankara Vijayendra Saraswati (28 February 2018 – Present)

See also
 Adi Shankara           
 Shankaracharya         
Kalady, Kerala - the holy birthplace of Jagadguru Adi Shankaracharya
Govardhan Math Peetham (East), Puri, Orissa                                     
Dwarka Sharada Peetham (West), Dwarka, Gujarat
Jyotir Math Badrikashram (North), Joshimath, Uttrakhand                                    
Shri Sringeri Sharada Peetham (South), Sringeri, Karnataka

References

Sources
Printed sources

 

 
 

 
 

 
 

 

 

 
 
 
 

 

Web-sources

External links
http://www.kamakoti.org/

Hindu monasteries in India
Hinduism in Tamil Nadu
Advaita Vedanta